James Richard Leyland (born December 15, 1944) is an American former professional baseball player, coach and manager. He serves as a special assistant to the Detroit Tigers of Major League Baseball (MLB).

Leyland led the Florida Marlins to the 1997 World Series championship over the Cleveland Indians, and previously won three straight division titles (1990, 1991, and 1992) with the Pittsburgh Pirates. He is one of eleven managers to lead three different teams to the postseason. With the Tigers' victory in the 2006 American League Championship Series, Leyland became the seventh manager in history to win pennants in both the National and American Leagues. He is a three-time Manager of the Year Award winner, twice in the National League (1990 and 1992), and once in the American League (2006).

Early career
Jim Leyland graduated from Perrysburg High School in 1962. Leyland began his baseball career with the Tigers when they signed him as a catcher on September 21, 1963. He spent seven seasons as a minor leaguer in the Tigers organization (1964–1970), but mainly served as a coach with the Montgomery Rebels in 1970 while playing in just two games for the team. Leyland was a career .222 hitter in the minor leagues.

In 1972, Leyland became a minor league manager in the Tigers organization; beginning with the Clinton Pilots of the Midwest League; from 1979–1981, he was the manager of the Evansville Triplets winning two divisions (1979, 1981) in the American Association.

Leyland left the Tigers organization for the first time in 1982 when he became Tony La Russa's third base coach for four seasons (1982–85) with the Chicago White Sox, including the team's 1983 AL West division title, before being named the 33rd manager in Pittsburgh Pirates history on November 20, 1985.

Managerial career

Pittsburgh Pirates
Leyland was the manager of the Pittsburgh Pirates from 1986 to 1996. He won two Manager of the Year trophies with the Pirates in 1990 and 1992, and finished as runner-up in 1988 and 1991.  Leyland helped develop such All-Stars as Barry Bonds, Jay Bell, Tim Wakefield, Andy Van Slyke and Bobby Bonilla in Pittsburgh before a fire sale in the mid-1990s soured him with new ownership. Under Leyland, the Pirates captured the National League Eastern Division title and went to the National League Championship Series in three straight seasons (1990, 1991, and 1992). Pittsburgh averaged 96 regular season victories those three years, but lost all three times in the NLCS with the latter two going the full seven games against the Atlanta Braves. The Pirates lost to the Cincinnati Reds (four games to two) in the 1990 NLCS.

Although he has moved on in his career, Leyland still keeps his home in the Pittsburgh suburb of Thornburg, Pennsylvania, where he has raised two children, Patrick and Kellie with his wife Katie. Patrick was a minor league catcher-first baseman in the Detroit (2010-2014) and Seattle (2015) organizations.

Leyland decided to quit after 11 seasons spent with the Pirates in order to manage a contender despite a contract that ran to 2000 with a salary of $1 million, stating that it was not a tough decision but a sad one, noting his dissatisfaction with owner Kevin McClatchy on trades and salary cutting.

One member of Leyland's coaching staff while with the Pirates, Terry Collins, who was most recently the manager of the New York Mets, wore number 10 to honor Leyland.

Florida Marlins and Colorado Rockies
In 1997, Leyland was hired by Wayne Huizenga to manage the Florida Marlins and promptly led them to the franchise's first World Championship that year, defeating the Cleveland Indians—four games to three—in the Fall Classic. The Marlins, in only their fifth year of existence, became the fastest expansion franchise to win a World Series. The Arizona Diamondbacks surpassed the Marlins when they won the World Series in 2001, their fourth season.

In the offseason, Huizenga dismantled the team in what became known as "the fire sale." After Game 7, when asked about rumors that he might retire if Huizenga sold the franchise, Leyland quipped, "My wife doesn't like me that much. I can't retire." Leyland indeed remained as the manager, but resigned after the 1998 season, when the Marlins went 54–108. Due to the details of his contract (alongside the team finding itself in the process of being sold), he received a $500,000 buyout for the remaining three years of his five-year contract.  Leyland was subsequently hired by the Colorado Rockies for the 1999 season. Leyland reached 1,000 wins on April 15, leading the Rockies to a 6-4 win over the San Diego Padres at Coors Field. He achieved the feat in his 2,048th game as manager.  Leyland ultimately came to regret the decision to manage in Colorado, saying that while he was treated well by the team, he felt he could not manage well with Coors Field in regards to pitching, as he described himself as "pitcher's manager." He walked away from the final two years of his contract after one season.  It was the fifth time in Leyland's 14 seasons that he skippered a team that finished last in its division. After this, he became a Pittsburgh-based scout for the St. Louis Cardinals.

Detroit Tigers

Following the release of Alan Trammell as the manager of the Tigers, Leyland was hired as new Tigers manager, returning to the franchise with which he spent the first 18 years of his professional baseball career. It marked the first time Leyland managed in the American League.

In the 2006 regular season, Leyland guided the Tigers to a 95–67 record, the Tigers' best season since 1987. The Tigers entered the playoffs as a wild card, and went on to defeat the New York Yankees and sweep the Oakland Athletics to win the American League pennant before falling to the St. Louis Cardinals in the 2006 World Series. In leading the team to the AL pennant, he became the seventh manager to win pennants in both major leagues, joining Joe McCarthy, Yogi Berra, Alvin Dark, Sparky Anderson, Dick Williams, and Tony La Russa. After the 2006 season ended, Leyland was recognized with the Manager of the Year award for the third time in his career. He became the third person to win the award in both leagues, joining La Russa and Bobby Cox. Leyland also won The Sporting News Manager of the Year Award for the American League in 2006.

The Tigers had heightened expectations after the pennant, but they muddled through the next four seasons, which included a last place finish in 2008 (the sixth and last time Leyland had skippered a last place team). Leyland would reach 1,500 wins on April 15, 2011 with a win over the Oakland Athletics, becoming the 19th manager to do so.  That year, he would lead the Tigers to another 95–67 regular season record (an improvement of 14 wins), winning the American League Central Division. They went on to defeat the New York Yankees in the American League Division Series before losing to the Texas Rangers in the American League Championship Series.

On May 1, 2012, Leyland gained his 1,600th victory as a major league manager, passing Tommy Lasorda on the all-time wins list. In 2012, Leyland led the Tigers to an 88–74 regular season record, winning the American League Central Division. On that team, Tigers third baseman Miguel Cabrera was the American League Triple Crown winner that season. This was the first Triple Crown winner in Major League Baseball since Carl Yastrzemski in 1967. When the Tigers won the AL Central for the second consecutive season, Leyland became the only Tigers manager besides Hughie Jennings to lead Detroit to the postseason three times.

In the 2012 postseason, Detroit defeated the Athletics in a five-game ALDS and returned to the World Series following a sweep of the New York Yankees in the American League Championship Series. Detroit was swept in the 2012 World Series by the San Francisco Giants. They were shut out twice, the same number as in the entire 162-game regular season, and had a team batting average of .159.

On September 25, 2013, Leyland won his 700th game with the Tigers. With the 1–0 victory over the Minnesota Twins, the Tigers clinched their third consecutive American League Central Division title. Leyland joined former coach Tony La Russa as the only managers who have led two different MLB franchises to three consecutive division titles. Of the eleven managers to have won three pennants, seven did so in the divisional era, and Leyland has the second most playoff appearances to have won three pennants with eight, with only Terry Francona having more appearances. His 44 postseason wins are tied for fourth most in MLB history with Bruce Bochy, while his 40 losses are fourth most. He retired from managing following the 2013 season, remaining with the Tigers organization as a special assistant. He was replaced by Brad Ausmus.

Team USA
On April 15, 2016, Leyland was named the manager of Team USA at the 2017 World Baseball Classic. The United States won the 2017 tournament under his leadership, making Leyland the only manager to win a World Series and a WBC title.

Managerial record

Personal life
His son, Pat Leyland, was drafted by the Tigers in 2010 and has also played in the Seattle Mariners and Baltimore Orioles organizations.
On May 30, 2017, Leyland was one of eight new inductees announced for the Michigan Sports Hall of Fame in Detroit. The ceremony took place on September 15, 2017.

See also

 List of Major League Baseball managers by wins

References

External links

 Jim Leyland at SABR (Baseball BioProject)

 
 Retrosheet
 "Why Isn't This Man Smiling?" – biographical article from ESPN.com
 Official Detroit Tigers biography

1944 births
Living people
Baseball catchers
Baseball coaches from Ohio
Baseball players from Ohio
Chicago White Sox coaches
Cocoa Rookie League Tigers players
Colorado Rockies managers
Detroit Tigers managers
Florida Instructional League Tigers players
Florida Marlins managers
Jamestown Tigers players
Lakeland Flying Tigers managers
Lakeland Tigers players
Major League Baseball third base coaches
Manager of the Year Award winners
Montgomery Rebels players
People from Perrysburg, Ohio
Pittsburgh Pirates managers
Rocky Mount Leafs players
St. Louis Cardinals scouts
United States national baseball team managers
World Baseball Classic managers
World Series-winning managers